Sharon Patricia Knight (born 27 January 1965) is an Australian politician. She was a member of the Victorian Legislative Assembly from 2010 to 2018, representing Ballarat West until 2014 and Wendouree thereafter.

References

External links

 Parliamentary voting record of Sharon Knight at Victorian Parliament Tracker

1965 births
Living people
Australian Labor Party members of the Parliament of Victoria
Members of the Victorian Legislative Assembly
21st-century Australian politicians
21st-century Australian women politicians
Women members of the Victorian Legislative Assembly